John Wingate Weeks (March 31, 1781 – April 3, 1853) was a U.S. Representative from New Hampshire, great uncle of John Wingate Weeks.

Born in Greenland, New Hampshire, Weeks attended the common schools and learned the carpenter's trade. During the War of 1812, he recruited a company for the Eleventh Regiment of United States Infantry and served as its captain.
He was promoted to the rank of major.  After the war, Weeks resided in Coos County, New Hampshire, where he held several local offices.

In 1820, together with a party that included Adrian N. Bracket, Philip Carrigain and Charles J. Stuart, Weeks enlisted Ethan Crawford as a guide in the White Mountains. The trip resulted in the party naming various peaks of the Presidential Range.

Weeks was elected as a Jacksonian to the Twenty-first and Twenty-second Congresses (March 4, 1829 – March 3, 1833). He died in Lancaster, New Hampshire, April 3, 1853, and was interred in the Old Cemetery.

References

1781 births
1853 deaths
United States Army officers
Jacksonian members of the United States House of Representatives from New Hampshire
19th-century American politicians